Noailles is a commune in the Corrèze department in central France.

Geography

Location
The commune, part of the urban area of Brive-la-Gaillarde, is located in the lower south of the Correze department, south of the Brive Basin, north of Causse de Martel. The location of the A20 autoroute nearby gives direct access to Brive 8 km away, via the Exit 52 interchange.

Population

See also
Communes of the Corrèze department

References

Communes of Corrèze